In geometry, an arrangement of lines is the subdivision of the plane formed by a collection of lines. Bounds on the complexity of arrangements have been studied in discrete geometry, and computational geometers have found algorithms for the efficient construction of arrangements.

Definition
Intuitively, any finite set of lines in the plane cuts the plane into two-dimensional polygons (cells), one-dimensional line segments or rays, and zero-dimensional crossing points. This can be formalized mathematically by classifying the points of the plane according to which side of each line they are on. Each line separates the plane into two open half-planes, and each point of the plane has three possibilities per line: it can be in either one of these two half-planes, or it can be on the line itself. Two points can be considered to be equivalent if they have the same classification with respect to all of the lines. This is an equivalence relation, whose equivalence classes are subsets of equivalent points. These subsets subdivide the plane into shapes of the following three types:
The cells or chambers of the arrangement are two-dimensional regions not part of any line. They form the interiors of bounded or unbounded convex polygons. If the plane is cut along all of the lines, these are the connected components of the points that remain uncut.
The edges or panels of the arrangement are one-dimensional regions belonging to a single line. They are the open line segments and open infinite rays into which each line is partitioned by its crossing points with the other lines. That is, if one of the lines is cut by all the other lines, these are the connected components of its uncut points.
The vertices of the arrangement are isolated points belonging to two or more lines, where those lines cross each other.
The boundary of a cell is the system of edges that touch it, and the boundary of an edge is the set of vertices that touch it (one vertex for a ray and two for a line segment). The system of objects of all three types, linked by this boundary operator, form a cell complex covering the plane. Two arrangements are said to be isomorphic or combinatorially equivalent if there is a one-to-one boundary-preserving correspondence between the objects in their associated cell complexes.

The same classification of points, and the same shapes of equivalence classes, can be used for infinite but locally finite arrangements, in which every bounded subset of the plane may be crossed by only finitely many lines, although in this case the unbounded cells may have infinitely many sides. Infinite systems of lines that are not locally finite may have equivalence classes of other shapes; for instance, the system of tangent lines to a unit circle has the interior of the circle as one of its equivalence classes.

Complexity of arrangements
The study of arrangements was begun by Jakob Steiner, who proved the first bounds on the maximum number of features of different types that an arrangement may have. The most straightforward features to count are the vertices, edges, and cells:
An arrangement with  lines has at most  vertices (a triangular number), one per pair of crossing lines. This maximum is achieved for simple arrangements, those in which each two lines cross at a point distinct from all other crossings.
In any arrangement (rotated slightly if necessary to avoid axis-parallel lines) there will be  infinite-downward rays, one per line. These rays separate  cells of the arrangement that are unbounded in the downward direction. The remaining cells all have a unique bottommost vertex, and each vertex is bottommost for a unique cell, so the number of cells in an arrangement is the number of vertices plus , or at most . These are the numbers of the lazy caterer's sequence.
The number of edges of the arrangement is at most , as may be seen either by using the Euler characteristic to calculate it from the numbers of vertices and cells, or by observing that each line is partitioned into at most  edges by the other  lines. Again, this worst-case bound is achieved for simple arrangements.

More complex features go by the names of "zones", "levels", and "many faces":

The zone theorem states that the total number of edges in the cells of a single zone is linear.
The -level of an arrangement is the polygonal chain formed by the edges that have exactly  other lines directly below them. The -level is the portion of the arrangement below the -level. Finding matching upper and lower bounds for the complexity of a -level remains a major open problem in discrete geometry;. In contrast, the maximum complexity of the -level is known to be . A -level is a special case of a monotone path in an arrangement; that is, a sequence of edges that intersects any vertical line in a single point.
Although a single cell in an arrangement may be bounded by all  lines, it is not possible in general for  different cells to all be bounded by  lines. Rather, the total complexity of  cells is at most , almost the same bound as occurs in the Szemerédi–Trotter theorem on point-line incidences in the plane. A simple proof of this follows from the crossing number inequality: if  cells have a total of  edges, one can form a graph with  nodes (one per cell) and  edges (one per pair of consecutive cells on the same line). The edges of this graph can be drawn as curves that do not cross within the cells corresponding to their endpoints, and then follow the lines of the arrangement. Therefore, there are  crossings in this drawing. However, by the crossing number inequality, there are  crossings. In order to satisfy both bounds,  must be .

Projective arrangements and projective duality
It is often convenient to study line arrangements not in the Euclidean plane but in the projective plane, due to the fact that in projective geometry every pair of lines has a crossing point. In the projective plane, it is not possible to define arrangements using sides of lines, because a line in the projective plane does not separate the plane into two distinct sides. However, one may still define the cells of an arrangement to be the connected components of the points not belonging to any line, the edges to be the connected components of sets of points belonging to a single line, and the vertices to be points where two or more lines cross. A line arrangement in the projective plane differs from its Euclidean counterpart in that the two Euclidean rays at either end of a line are replaced by a single edge in the projective plane that connects the leftmost and rightmost vertices on that line, and in that pairs of unbounded Euclidean cells are replaced in the projective plane by single cells that are crossed by the projective line at infinity.

Due to projective duality, many statements about the combinatorial properties of points in the plane may be more easily understood in an equivalent dual form about arrangements of lines. For instance, the Sylvester–Gallai theorem, stating that any non-collinear set of points in the plane has an ordinary line containing exactly two points, transforms under projective duality to the statement that any projective arrangement of finitely many lines with more than one vertex has an ordinary point, a vertex where only two lines cross.

Triangles in arrangements

An arrangement of lines in the projective plane is said to be simplicial if every cell of the arrangement is bounded by exactly three edges. Simplicial arrangements were first studied by Melchior. Three infinite families of simplicial line arrangements are known:
A near-pencil consisting of  lines through a single point, together with a single additional line that does not go through the same point,
The family of lines formed by the sides of a regular polygon together with its axes of symmetry, and
The sides and axes of symmetry of an even regular polygon, together with the line at infinity.
Additionally there are many other examples of sporadic simplicial arrangements that do not fit into any known infinite family.
As Branko Grünbaum writes, simplicial arrangements "appear as examples or counterexamples in many contexts of combinatorial geometry and its applications." For instance,  use simplicial arrangements to construct counterexamples to a conjecture on the relation between the degree of a set of differential equations and the number of invariant lines the equations may have. The two known counterexamples to the Dirac–Motzkin conjecture (which states that any -line arrangement has at least  ordinary points) are both simplicial.

The dual graph of a line arrangement, in which there is one node per cell and one edge linking any pair of cells that share an edge of the arrangement, is a partial cube, a graph in which the nodes can be labeled by bitvectors in such a way that the graph distance equals the Hamming distance between labels; in the case of a line arrangement, each coordinate of the labeling assigns 0 to nodes on one side of one of the lines and 1 to nodes on the other side. Dual graphs of simplicial arrangements have been used to construct infinite families of 3-regular partial cubes, isomorphic to the graphs of simple zonohedra.

It is also of interest to study the extremal numbers of triangular cells in arrangements that may not necessarily be simplicial. In any arrangement, there must be at least  triangles; every arrangement that has only  triangles must be simple. For non-simple arrangements the maximum number of triangles is similar but more tightly bounded. The closely related Kobon triangle problem asks for the maximum number of non-overlapping finite triangles in an arrangement in the Euclidean plane, not counting the unbounded faces that might form triangles in the projective plane.

Multigrids and rhombus tilings
The dual graph of a simple line arrangement may be represented geometrically as a collection of rhombi, one per vertex of the arrangement, with sides perpendicular to the lines that meet at that vertex. These rhombi may be joined together to form a tiling of a convex polygon in the case of an arrangement of finitely many lines, or of the entire plane in the case of a locally finite arrangement with infinitely many lines. This construction is sometimes known as a Klee diagram, after a publication of Rudolf Klee in 1938 that used this technique. Not every rhombus tiling comes from lines in this way, however.

 investigated special cases of this construction in which the line arrangement consists of  sets of equally spaced parallel lines. For two perpendicular families of parallel lines this construction just gives the familiar square tiling of the plane, and for three families of lines at 120-degree angles from each other (themselves forming a trihexagonal tiling) this produces the rhombille tiling. However, for more families of lines this construction produces aperiodic tilings. In particular, for five families of lines at equal angles to each other (or, as de Bruijn calls this arrangement, a pentagrid) it produces a family of tilings that include the rhombic version of the Penrose tilings.

There also exist three infinite simplicial arrangements formed from sets of parallel lines. The tetrakis square tiling is an infinite arrangement of lines forming a periodic tiling that resembles a multigrid with four parallel families, but in which two of the families are more widely spaced than the other two, and in which the arrangement is simplicial rather than simple. Its dual is the truncated square tiling. Similarly, the triangular tiling is an infinite simplicial line arrangement with three parallel families, which has as its dual the hexagonal tiling, and the bisected hexagonal tiling is an infinite simplicial line arrangement with six parallel families and two line spacings, dual to the great rhombitrihexagonal tiling. These three examples come from three affine reflection groups in the Euclidean plane, systems of symmetries based on reflection across each line in these arrangements.

Algorithms
Constructing an arrangement means, given as input a list of the lines in the arrangement, computing a representation of the vertices, edges, and cells of the arrangement together with the adjacencies between these objects, for instance as a doubly connected edge list. However, the memory requirements of this algorithm are high, so it may be more convenient to report all features of an arrangement by an algorithm that does not keep the entire arrangement in memory at once. This may again be done efficiently, in time  and space , by an algorithmic technique known as topological sweeping. Computing a line arrangement exactly requires a numerical precision several times greater than that of the input coordinates: if a line is specified by two points on it, the coordinates of the arrangement vertices may need four times as much precision as these input points. Therefore, computational geometers have also studied algorithms for constructing arrangements efficiently with limited numerical precision.

As well, researchers have studied efficient algorithms for constructing smaller portions of an arrangement, such as zones, -levels, or the set of cells containing a given set of points. The problem of finding the arrangement vertex with the median -coordinate arises (in a dual form) in robust statistics as the problem of computing the Theil–Sen estimator of a set of points.

Marc van Kreveld suggested the algorithmic problem of computing shortest paths between vertices in a line arrangement, where the paths are restricted to follow the edges of the arrangement, more quickly than the quadratic time that it would take to apply a shortest path algorithm to the whole arrangement graph. An approximation algorithm is known, and the problem may be solved efficiently for lines that fall into a small number of parallel families (as is typical for urban street grids), but the general problem remains open.

Non-Euclidean line arrangements

A pseudoline arrangement is a family of curves that share similar topological properties with a line arrangement. These can be defined most simply in the projective plane as simple closed curves any two of which meet in a single crossing point. A pseudoline arrangement is said to be stretchable if it is combinatorially equivalent to a line arrangement. Determining stretchability is a difficult computational task: it is complete for the existential theory of the reals to distinguish stretchable arrangements from non-stretchable ones. Every arrangement of finitely many pseudolines can be extended so that they become lines in a "spread", a type of non-Euclidean incidence geometry in which every two points of a topological plane are connected by a unique line (as in the Euclidean plane) but in which other axioms of Euclidean geometry may not apply.

Another type of non-Euclidean geometry is the hyperbolic plane, and
arrangements of hyperbolic lines in this geometry have also been studied. Any finite set of lines in the Euclidean plane has a combinatorially equivalent arrangement in the hyperbolic plane (e.g. by enclosing the vertices of the arrangement by a large circle and interpreting the interior of the circle as a Klein model of the hyperbolic plane). However, parallel (non-crossing) pairs of lines are less restricted in hyperbolic line arrangements than in the Euclidean plane: in particular, the relation of being parallel is an equivalence relation for Euclidean lines but not for hyperbolic lines. The intersection graph of the lines in a hyperbolic arrangement can be an arbitrary circle graph. The corresponding concept to hyperbolic line arrangements for pseudolines is a weak pseudoline arrangement, a family of curves having the same topological properties as lines such that any two curves in the family either meet in a single crossing point or have no intersection.

See also
Configuration (geometry), an arrangement of lines and a set of points with all lines containing the same number of points and all points belonging to the same number of lines
Arrangement (space partition), a partition of the plane given by overlaid curves or of a higher dimensional space by overlaid surfaces, without requiring the curves or surfaces to be flat
Mathematical Bridge, a bridge in Cambridge, England whose beams form an arrangement of tangent lines to its arch

Notes

References

; see Example 10.14, pp. 519–520

; see p. 6 of "Euclidean arrangements" (p. 101 of linked pdf)

External links 
 Database of Combinatorially Different Line Arrangements

Discrete geometry
Euclidean plane geometry